Arındık can refer to:

 Arındık, Elâzığ
 Arındık, Palu